The Czechoslovak Open was a professional golf tournament played from 1935 to 1938. Mark Seymour won the inaugural 1935 championship with a score a 276, a record low aggregate for an open championship. Seymour retained the title in 1936 while Henry Cotton won in 1937 and 1938. The first three championships were held near Marienbad at the Royal Golf Club Mariánské Lázně.

Winners

References

Golf tournaments in the Czech Republic
Recurring sporting events established in 1935
Recurring sporting events disestablished in 1938
1935 establishments in Czechoslovakia
1938 disestablishments in Czechoslovakia